

Events

Pre-1600
118 – Hadrian, who became emperor a year previously on Trajan's death, makes his entry into Rome. 
 381 – The end of the First Council of Christian bishops convened in Constantinople by the Roman Emperor Theodosius I.
 491 – Odoacer makes a night assault with his Heruli guardsmen, engaging Theoderic the Great in Ad Pinetam. Both sides suffer heavy losses, but in the end Theodoric forces Odoacer back into Ravenna.
 551 – A major earthquake strikes Beirut, triggering a devastating tsunami that affected the coastal towns of Byzantine Phoenicia, causing thousands of deaths.
 660 – Korean forces under general Kim Yu-sin of Silla defeat the army of Baekje in the Battle of Hwangsanbeol.
 869 – The 8.4–9.0 Sanriku earthquake strikes the area around Sendai in northern Honshu, Japan. Inundation from the tsunami extended several kilometers inland.
 969 – The Fatimid general Jawhar leads the Friday prayer in Fustat in the name of Caliph al-Mu'izz li-Din Allah, thereby symbolically completing the Fatimid conquest of Egypt.
1357 – Emperor Charles IV assists in laying the foundation stone of Charles Bridge in Prague.
1386 – The Old Swiss Confederacy makes great strides in establishing control over its territory by soundly defeating the Duchy of Austria in the Battle of Sempach.
1401 – Timur attacks the Jalairid Sultanate and destroys Baghdad.
1540 – King Henry VIII of England annuls his marriage to his fourth wife, Anne of Cleves.
1572 – Nineteen Catholics suffer martyrdom for their beliefs in the Dutch town of Gorkum.

1601–1900
1609 – Bohemia is granted freedom of religion through the Letter of Majesty by the Holy Roman Emperor, Rudolf II.
1701 – A Bourbon force under Nicolas Catinat withdraws from a smaller Habsburg force under Prince Eugene of Savoy in the Battle of Carpi.
1745 – French victory in the Battle of Melle allows them to capture Ghent in the days after.
1755 – The Braddock Expedition is soundly defeated by a smaller French and Native American force in its attempt to capture Fort Duquesne in what is now downtown Pittsburgh.
1762 – Catherine the Great becomes Empress of Russia following the coup against her husband, Peter III. 
1763 – The Mozart family grand tour of Europe began, lifting the profile of prodigal son Wolfgang Amadeus.
1776 – George Washington orders the Declaration of Independence to be read out to members of the Continental Army in Manhattan, while thousands of British troops on Staten Island prepare for the Battle of Long Island.
1789 – In Versailles, the National Assembly reconstitutes itself as the National Constituent Assembly and begins preparations for a French constitution.
1790 – The Swedish Navy captures one third of the Russian Baltic fleet.
1793 – The Act Against Slavery in Upper Canada bans the importation of slaves and will free those who are born into slavery after the passage of the Act at 25 years of age.
1795 – Financier James Swan pays off the $2,024,899 US national debt that had been accrued during the American Revolution.
1807 – The second Treaty of Tilsit is signed between France and Prussia, ending the War of the Fourth Coalition.
1810 – Napoleon annexes the Kingdom of Holland as part of the First French Empire.
1811 – Explorer David Thompson posts a sign near what is now Sacajawea State Park in Washington state, claiming the Columbia District for the United Kingdom.
1815 – Charles Maurice de Talleyrand-Périgord becomes the first Prime Minister of France.
1816 – Argentina declares independence from Spain.
1821 – Four hundred and seventy prominent Cypriots including Archbishop Kyprianos are executed in response to Cypriot aid to the Greek War of Independence.
1850 – U.S. President Zachary Taylor dies after eating raw fruit and iced milk; he is succeeded in office by Vice President Millard Fillmore.
  1850   – Persian prophet Báb is executed in Tabriz, Persia.
1863 – American Civil War: The Siege of Port Hudson ends, giving the Union complete control of the Mississippi River.
1868 – The 14th Amendment to the United States Constitution is ratified, guaranteeing African Americans full citizenship and all persons in the United States due process of law.
1875 – The Herzegovina Uprising against Ottoman rule begins, which would last until 1878 and have far-reaching implications throughout the Balkans.
1877 – The inaugural Wimbledon Championships begins.
1893 – Daniel Hale Williams, American heart surgeon, performs the first successful open-heart surgery in United States without anesthesia.
1896 – William Jennings Bryan delivers his Cross of Gold speech advocating bimetallism at the 1896 Democratic National Convention in Chicago.
1900 – The Federation of Australia is given royal assent.
  1900   – The Governor of Shanxi province in North China orders the execution of 45 foreign Christian missionaries and local church members, including children.

1901–present
1918 – In Nashville, Tennessee, an inbound local train collides with an outbound express, killing 101 and injuring 171 people, making it the deadliest rail accident in United States history.
1922 – Johnny Weissmuller swims the 100 meters freestyle in 58.6 seconds breaking the world swimming record and the 'minute barrier'.
1926 – Chiang Kai-shek accepts the post of commander-in-chief of the National Revolutionary Army, marking the beginning of the Northern Expedition to unite China under the rule of the Nationalist government.
1932 – The state of São Paulo revolts against the Brazilian Federal Government, starting the Constitutionalist Revolution.
1937 – The silent film archives of Fox Film Corporation are destroyed by the 1937 Fox vault fire.
1943 – World War II: The Allied invasion of Sicily begins, leading to the downfall of Mussolini and forcing Hitler to break off the Battle of Kursk.
1944 – World War II: American forces take Saipan, bringing the Japanese archipelago within range of B-29 raids, and causing the downfall of the Tojo government.
  1944   – World War II: Continuation War: Finland wins the Battle of Tali–Ihantala, the largest battle ever fought in northern Europe. The Red Army withdraws its troops from Ihantala and digs into a defensive position, thus ending the Vyborg–Petrozavodsk Offensive.
1955 – The Russell–Einstein Manifesto calls for a reduction of the risk of nuclear warfare.
1956 – The 7.7  Amorgos earthquake shakes the Cyclades island group in the Aegean Sea with a maximum Mercalli intensity of IX (Violent). The shaking and the destructive tsunami that followed left fifty-three people dead. A damaging M7.2 aftershock occurred minutes after the mainshock.
1958 – A 7.8  strike-slip earthquake in Alaska causes a landslide that produces a megatsunami. The runup from the waves reached  on the rim of Lituya Bay; five people were killed.
1961 – Greece becomes the first member state to join the European Economic Community by signing the Athens Agreement, which was suspended in 1967 during the Greek junta.
1962 – Starfish Prime tests the effects of a nuclear test at orbital altitudes.
1977 – The Pinochet dictatorship in Chile organises the youth event of Acto de Chacarillas, a ritualised act reminiscent of Francoist Spain.
1979 – A car bomb destroys a Renault motor car owned by "Nazi hunters" Serge and Beate Klarsfeld outside their home in France in an unsuccessful assassination attempt.
1982 – Pan Am Flight 759 crashes in Kenner, Louisiana, killing all 145 people on board and eight others on the ground.
1986 – The New Zealand Parliament passes the Homosexual Law Reform Act legalising homosexuality in New Zealand.
1993 – The Parliament of Canada passes the Nunavut Act leading to the 1999 creation of Nunavut, dividing the Northwest Territories into arctic (Inuit) and sub-arctic (Dene) lands based on a plebiscite.
1995 – The Navaly church bombing is carried out by the Sri Lanka Air Force killing 125 Tamil civilian refugees.
1997 – A Fokker 100 from the Brazilian airline TAM launches engineer Fernando Caldeira de Moura Campos into 2,400 meters of free fall after an explosion that depressurized the aircraft.
1999 – Days of student protests begin after Iranian police and hardliners attack a student dormitory at the University of Tehran.
2002 – The African Union is established in Addis Ababa, Ethiopia, replacing the Organisation of African Unity (OAU). The organization's first chairman is Thabo Mbeki, President of South Africa.
2006 – One hundred and twenty-five people are killed when S7 Airlines Flight 778, an Airbus A310 passenger jet, veers off the runway while landing in wet conditions at Irkutsk Airport in Siberia.
2011 – South Sudan gains independence and secedes from Sudan.
  2011   – A rally takes place in Kuala Lumpur, Malaysia to call for fairer elections in the country.

Births

Pre-1600
1249 – Emperor Kameyama of Japan (d. 1305)
1455 – Frederick IV of Baden, Dutch bishop (d. 1517)
1511 – Dorothea of Saxe-Lauenburg, queen consort of Denmark and Norway (d. 1571)
1526 – Elizabeth of Austria, Polish noble (d. 1545)
1577 – Thomas West, 3rd Baron De La Warr, English-American soldier and politician, Colonial Governor of Virginia (d. 1618)
1578 – Ferdinand II, Holy Roman Emperor (d. 1637)

1601–1900
1654 – Emperor Reigen of Japan (d. 1732)
1686 – Philip Livingston, American merchant and politician (d. 1749)
1689 – Alexis Piron, French epigrammatist and playwright (d. 1773)
1721 – Johann Nikolaus Götz, German poet and author (d. 1781)
1753 – William Waldegrave, 1st Baron Radstock, English admiral and politician, 34th Lieutenant Governor of Newfoundland (d. 1825)
1764 – Ann Ward, English author and poet (d. 1823)
1775 – Matthew Lewis, English author and playwright (d. 1818)
1777 – Paavo Ruotsalainen, Finnish farmer and lay preacher (d. 1852)
1800 – Friedrich Gustav Jakob Henle, German physician, pathologist, and anatomist (d. 1885)
1808 – Alexander William Doniphan, American lawyer and colonel (d. 1887)
1819 – Elias Howe, American inventor, invented the sewing machine (d. 1867)
1825 – A. C. Gibbs, American lawyer and politician, 2nd Governor of Oregon (d. 1886)
1828 – Luigi Oreglia di Santo Stefano, Italian cardinal (d. 1913)
1834 – Jan Neruda, Czech journalist and poet (d. 1891)
1836 – Camille of Renesse-Breidbach (d. 1904)
1848 – Robert I, Duke of Parma (d. 1907)
1853 – William Turner Dannat, American painter (d. 1929)
1856 – John Verran, English-Australian politician, 26th Premier of South Australia (d. 1932)
1858 – Franz Boas, German-American anthropologist and linguist (d. 1942)
1867 – Georges Lecomte, French author and playwright (d. 1958)
1879 – Carlos Chagas, Brazilian physician and parasitologist (d. 1934)
  1879   – Ottorino Respighi, Italian composer and conductor (d. 1936)
1887 – James Ormsbee Chapin, American-Canadian painter and illustrator (d. 1975)
  1887   – Saturnino Herrán, Mexican painter (d. 1918)
  1887   – Samuel Eliot Morison, American admiral and historian (d. 1976)
1889 – Léo Dandurand, American-Canadian ice hockey player, coach, and referee (d. 1964)
1893 – George Geary, English cricketer and coach (d. 1981)

1901–present
1901 – Barbara Cartland, English author (d. 2000)
1902 – Peter Acland, English soldier (d. 1993)
1905 – Clarence Campbell, Canadian ice hockey player and referee (d. 1984)
1907 – Eddie Dean, American singer-songwriter (d. 1999)
1908 – Allamah Rasheed Turabi, Pakistani philosopher and scholar (d. 1973)
  1908   – Minor White, American photographer, critic, and educator (d. 1976)
1909 – Basil Wolverton, American author and illustrator (d. 1978)
1910 – Govan Mbeki, South African anti-apartheid and ANC leader and activist (d. 2001)
1911 – Mervyn Peake, English author and illustrator (d. 1968)
  1911   – John Archibald Wheeler, American physicist and author (d. 2008)
1914 – Willi Stoph, German engineer and politician, 4th Prime Minister of East Germany (d. 1999)
  1914   – Mac Wilson, Australian rules footballer (d. 2017)
1915 – David Diamond, American composer and educator (d. 2005)
  1915   – Lee Embree, American sergeant and photographer (d. 2008)
1916 – Dean Goffin, New Zealand composer (d. 1984)
  1916   – Edward Heath, English colonel and politician; Prime Minister of the United Kingdom, 1970-74 (d. 2005)
1917 – Krystyna Dańko, Polish orphan, survivor of Holocaust (d. 2019)
1918 – Nicolaas Govert de Bruijn, Dutch mathematician and academic (d. 2012)
  1918   – Jarl Wahlström, Finnish 12th General of The Salvation Army (d. 1999)
1921 – David C. Jones, American general (d. 2013)
1922 – Kathleen Booth, British computer scientist and mathematician (d. 2022)
  1922   – Angelines Fernández, Spanish-Mexican actress (d. 1994)
  1922   – Jim Pollard, American basketball player and coach (d. 1993)
1924 – Pierre Cochereau, French organist and composer (d. 1984) 
1925 – Guru Dutt, Indian actor, director, and producer (d. 1964)
  1925   – Charles E. Wicks, American engineer, author, and academic (d. 2010)
  1925   – Ronald I. Spiers, American ambassador (d. 2021)
1926 – Murphy Anderson, American illustrator (d. 2015)
  1926   – Ben Roy Mottelson, American-Danish physicist and academic, Nobel Prize laureate (d. 2022)
  1926   – Pedro Dellacha, Argentine football defender and coach (d. 2010)
  1926   – Mathilde Krim, Italian-American medical researcher and health educator (d. 2018)
1927 – Ed Ames, American singer and actor 
  1927   – Red Kelly, Canadian ice hockey player, coach, and politician (d. 2019)
1928 – Federico Bahamontes, Spanish cyclist
  1928   – Vince Edwards, American actor, singer, and director (d. 1996)
1929 – Lee Hazlewood, American singer-songwriter and producer (d. 2007)
  1929   – Jesse McReynolds, American singer and mandolin player 
  1929   – Chi Haotian, Chinese general
  1929   – Hassan II of Morocco (d. 1999)
1930 – K. Balachander, Indian actor, director, producer, and screenwriter (d. 2014)
  1930   – Buddy Bregman, American composer and conductor (d. 2017)
  1930   – Janice Lourie, American computer scientist and graphic artist
  1930   – Elsa Lystad, Norwegian actress
  1930   – Patricia Newcomb, American publicist 
  1930   – Roy McLean, South African cricketer and rugby player (d. 2007)
1931 – Haynes Johnson, American journalist and author (d. 2013)
  1931   – Sylvia Bacon, American judge
1932 – Donald Rumsfeld, American captain and politician, 13th United States Secretary of Defense (d. 2021)
  1932   – Amitzur Shapira, Israeli sprinter and long jumper (d. 1972)
1933 – Oliver Sacks, English-American neurologist, author, and academic (d. 2015)
1934 – Michael Graves, American architect, designed the Portland Building and the Humana Building (d. 2015)
1935 – Wim Duisenberg, Dutch economist and politician, Dutch Minister of Finance (d. 2005)
  1935   – Mercedes Sosa, Argentinian singer and activist (d. 2009)
  1935   – Michael Williams, English actor (d. 2001)
1936 – June Jordan, American poet and educator (d. 2002)
  1936   – David Zinman, American violinist and conductor
1937 – David Hockney, English painter and photographer
1938 – Brian Dennehy, American actor (d. 2020)
  1938   – Sanjeev Kumar, Indian film actor (d. 1985)
1940 – David B. Frohnmayer, American lawyer and politician, 12th Oregon Attorney General (d. 2015)
  1940   – Eugene Victor Wolfenstein, American psychoanalyst and theorist (d. 2010)
1941 – Mac MacLeod, English musician (d. 2020)
1942 – David Chidgey, Baron Chidgey, English engineer and politician (d. 2022)
  1942   – Richard Roundtree, American actor
1943 – John Casper, American colonel, pilot, and astronaut
1944 – Judith M. Brown, Indian-English historian and academic
  1944   – John Cunniff, American ice hockey player and coach (d. 2002)
  1944   – Tabassum, Indian actress and talk show host (d. 2022)
1945 – Dean Koontz, American author and screenwriter
  1945   – Root Boy Slim, American singer-songwriter and guitarist (d. 1993)
1946 – Bon Scott, Scottish-Australian singer-songwriter (d. 1980)
1947 – Haruomi Hosono, Japanese singer-songwriter, bass player, and producer 
  1947   – Mitch Mitchell, English drummer (d. 2008)
  1947   – O. J. Simpson, American football player and actor
  1947   – Patrick Wormald, English historian (d. 2004)
1948 – Hassan Wirajuda, Indonesian lawyer and politician, 15th Indonesian Minister of Foreign Affairs
1949 – Raoul Cédras, Haitian military officer and politician
1950 – Amal ibn Idris al-Alami, Moroccan physician and neurosurgeon
  1950   – Adriano Panatta, Italian tennis player and sailor
  1950   – Viktor Yanukovych, Ukrainian engineer and politician, 4th President of Ukraine
1951 – Chris Cooper, American actor
  1951   – Māris Gailis, Latvian politician, businessman, and former Prime Minister of Latvia 
1952 – John Tesh, American pianist, composer, and radio and television host
1953 – Margie Gillis, Canadian dancer and choreographer
  1953   – Thomas Ligotti, American author
1954 – Théophile Abega, Cameroonian footballer and politician (d. 2012)
  1954   – Kevin O'Leary, Canadian journalist and businessman
1955 – Steve Coppell, English footballer and manager
  1955   – Lindsey Graham, American lawyer and politician
  1955   – Jimmy Smits, American actor and producer
  1955   – Willie Wilson, American baseball player and manager
1956 – Tom Hanks, American actor, director, producer, and screenwriter
  1956   – Michael Lederer, American author, poet, and playwright
1957 – Marc Almond, English singer-songwriter 
  1957   – Tim Kring, American screenwriter and producer
  1957   – Kelly McGillis, American actress
  1957   – Paul Merton, English comedian, actor, and screenwriter
1958 – Abdul Latiff Ahmad, Malaysian politician
  1958   – Jacob Joseph, Malaysian football coach
1959 – Jim Kerr, Scottish singer-songwriter and keyboard player 
  1959   – Kevin Nash, American professional wrestler and actor
  1959   – Clive Stafford Smith, English lawyer and author
1960 – Yūko Asano, Japanese actress and singer
  1960   – Wally Fullerton Smith, Australian rugby league player
  1960   – Eduardo Montes-Bradley, Argentinian journalist, photographer, and author
1963 – Klaus Theiss, German footballer
1964 – Courtney Love, American singer-songwriter, guitarist, and actress 
  1964   – Gianluca Vialli, Italian footballer and coach (d. 2023)
1965 – Frank Bello, American bass player 
  1965   – Thomas Jahn, German director and screenwriter
  1965   – Jason Rhoades, American sculptor (d. 2006)
1966 – Pamela Adlon, American actress and voice artist
  1966   – Zheng Cao, Chinese-American soprano and actress (d. 2013)
  1966   – Gary Glasberg, American television writer and producer (d. 2016) 
  1966   – Marco Pennette, American screenwriter and producer
1967 – Gunnar Axén, Swedish politician
  1967   – Yordan Letchkov, Bulgarian footballer
  1967   – Mark Stoops, American football player and coach
  1967   – Julie Thomas, Welsh lawn bowler
1968 – Paolo Di Canio, Italian footballer and manager
1969 – Nicklas Barker, Swedish singer-songwriter and guitarist 
  1969   – Jason Kearton, Australian footballer and coach
1970 – Trent Green, American football player and sportscaster
  1970   – Masami Tsuda, Japanese author and illustrator
1971 – Marc Andreessen, American software developer, co-founded Netscape
1972 – Ara Babajian, American drummer and songwriter 
1973 – Kelly Holcomb, American football player and sportscaster
1974 – Siân Berry, English environmentalist and politician
  1974   – Ian Bradshaw, Barbadian cricketer
  1974   – Gary Kelly, Irish footballer
  1974   – Kārlis Skrastiņš, Latvian ice hockey player (d. 2011)
  1974   – Nikola Šarčević, Swedish singer-songwriter and bass player 
1975 – Shelton Benjamin, American wrestler
  1975   – Isaac Brock, American singer-songwriter and guitarist 
  1975   – Robert Koenig, American director, producer, and screenwriter
  1975   – Craig Quinnell, Welsh rugby player
  1975   – Jack White, American singer-songwriter, guitarist, and producer 
1976 – Thomas Cichon, Polish-German footballer and manager
  1976   – Fred Savage, American actor, director, and producer
  1976   – Radike Samo, Fijian-Australian rugby player
1978 – Kara Goucher, American runner
  1978   – Nuno Santos, Portuguese footballer
1979 – Gary Chaw, Malaysian Chinese singer-songwriter 
1981 – Lee Chun-soo, South Korean footballer
  1981   – Junauda Petrus, American author and performance artist
1982 – Alecko Eskandarian, American soccer player and manager
  1982   – Sakon Yamamoto, Japanese race car driver
1984 – Chris Campoli, Canadian ice hockey player
  1984   – Gianni Fabiano, Italian footballer
  1984   – Jacob Hoggard, Canadian singer-songwriter and guitarist 
  1984   – Ave Pajo, Estonian footballer
  1984   – Piia Suomalainen, Finnish tennis player
  1984   – LA Tenorio, Filipino basketball player  
1985 – Paweł Korzeniowski, Polish swimmer
  1985   – Ashley Young, English footballer
1986 – Sébastien Bassong, Cameroonian footballer
  1986   – Simon Dumont, American skier
  1986   – Kiely Williams, American singer-songwriter and dancer 
1987 – Gert Jõeäär, Estonian cyclist
  1987   – Rebecca Sugar, American animator, composer, and screenwriter
1988 – Raul Rusescu, Romanian footballer
1990 – Earl Bamber, New Zealand race car driver
  1990   – Fábio, Brazilian footballer
  1990   – Rafael, Brazilian footballer
1991 – Mitchel Musso, American actor and singer  
1993 – Mitch Larkin, Australian swimmer
  1993   – DeAndre Yedlin, American footballer
1999 – Claire Corlett, American voice actress

Deaths

Pre-1600
 230 – Empress Dowager Bian, Cao Cao's wife (b. 159)
 518 – Anastasius I Dicorus, Byzantine emperor (b. 430)
 715 – Naga, Japanese prince (b.c 637)
 880 – Ariwara no Narihira, Japanese poet (b. 825)
 981 – Ramiro Garcés, king of Viguera
1169 – Guido of Ravenna, Italian cartographer, entomologist and historian
1228 – Stephen Langton, English cardinal and theologian (b. 1150)
1270 – Stephen Báncsa, Hungarian cardinal (b. c. 1205)
1386 – Leopold III, Duke of Austria (b. 1351)
1441 – Jan van Eyck, Dutch painter (b.1359)
1546 – Robert Maxwell, 5th Lord Maxwell, Scottish statesman (b. c. 1493)
1553 – Maurice, Elector of Saxony (b. 1521)

1601–1900
1654 – Ferdinand IV, King of the Romans (b. 1633)
1706 – Pierre Le Moyne d'Iberville, Canadian captain and explorer (b. 1661)
1737 – Gian Gastone de' Medici, Grand Duke of Tuscany (b. 1671)
1742 – John Oldmixon, English historian, poet, and playwright (b. 1673)
1746 – Philip V of Spain (b. 1683)
1747 – Giovanni Bononcini, Italian cellist and composer (b. 1670)
1766 – Jonathan Mayhew, American minister (b. 1720)
1774 – Anna Morandi Manzolini, Spanish anatomist (b. 1714)
1795 – Henry Seymour Conway, English general and politician, Secretary of State for the Northern Department (b. 1721)
1797 – Edmund Burke, Irish-English philosopher, academic, and politician (b. 1729)
1828 – Cathinka Buchwieser, German operatic singer and actress (b. 1789)
1850 – Báb, Persian religious leader, founded Bábism (b. 1819)
  1850   – Zachary Taylor, American general and politician, 12th President of the United States (b. 1784)
1852 – Thomas McKean Thompson McKennan, American lawyer and politician, 2nd United States Secretary of the Interior (b. 1794)
1856 – Amedeo Avogadro, Italian chemist and academic (b. 1776)
  1856   – James Strang, American religious leader and politician (b. 1813)
1880 – Paul Broca, French physician and anatomist (b. 1824)
1882 – Ignacio Carrera Pinto, Chilean captain (b. 1848)

1901–present
1903 – Alphonse François Renard, Belgian geologist and photographer (b. 1842)
1927 – John Drew, Jr., American actor (b. 1853)
1932 – King Camp Gillette, American businessman, founded the Gillette Company (b. 1855)
 1935 – Daniel Edward Howard, 16th president of Liberia (b. 1861)
1937 – Oliver Law, American commander (b. 1899)
1938 – Benjamin N. Cardozo, American lawyer and jurist (b. 1870)
1947 – Lucjan Żeligowski, Polish-Lithuanian general and politician (b. 1865)
1949 – Fritz Hart, English-Australian composer and conductor (b. 1874)
1951 – Harry Heilmann, American baseball player and sportscaster (b. 1894)
1955 – Don Beauman, English race car driver (b. 1928)
  1955   – Adolfo de la Huerta, Mexican politician and provisional president, 1920 (b. 1881)
1959 – Ferenc Talányi, Slovene journalist and painter (b. 1883)
1962 – Georges Bataille, French philosopher, novelist, and poet (b. 1897)
1961 – Whittaker Chambers, American spy and witness in Hiss case(b. 1901)
1967 – Eugen Fischer, German physician and academic (b. 1874)
  1967   – Fatima Jinnah, Pakistani dentist and politician (b. 1893)
1970 – Sigrid Holmquist, Swedish actress (b. 1899) 
1971 – Karl Ast, Estonian author and politician (b. 1886)
1972 – Robert Weede, American opera singer (b. 1903)
1974 – Earl Warren, American jurist and politician, 14th Chief Justice of the United States (b. 1891)
1977 – Alice Paul, American activist (b. 1885)
1979 – Cornelia Otis Skinner, American actress and author (b. 1899)
1980 – Vinicius de Moraes, Brazilian poet, playwright, and composer (b. 1913)
1984 – Edna Ernestine Kramer, American mathematician (b. 1902)
1985 – Charlotte, Grand Duchess of Luxembourg (b. 1896)
  1985   – Jimmy Kinnon, Scottish-American activist, founded Narcotics Anonymous (b. 1911)
1986 – Patriarch Nicholas VI of Alexandria (b. 1915)
1992 – Kelvin Coe, Australian ballet dancer (b. 1946)
  1992   – Eric Sevareid, American journalist (b. 1912)
1993 – Metin Altıok, Turkish poet and educator (b. 1940)
1994 – Bill Mosienko, Canadian ice hockey player (b. 1921)
1996 – Melvin Belli, American lawyer (b. 1907)
1999 – Robert de Cotret, Canadian politician, 56th Secretary of State for Canada (b. 1944)
2000 – Doug Fisher, English actor (b. 1941)
2002 – Mayo Kaan, American bodybuilder (b. 1914)
  2002   – Rod Steiger, American actor (b. 1925)
2004 – Paul Klebnikov, American journalist and historian (b. 1963)
  2004   – Isabel Sanford, American actress (b. 1917)
2005 – Chuck Cadman, Canadian engineer and politician (b. 1948)
  2005   – Yevgeny Grishin, Russian speed skater (b. 1931)
  2005   – Alex Shibicky, Canadian ice hockey player (b. 1914)
2006 – Milan Williams, American keyboard player and producer (b. 1948)
2007 – Charles Lane, American actor (b. 1905)
2008 – Séamus Brennan, Irish accountant and politician, Minister for Transport, Tourism and Sport (b. 1948)
2010 – Jessica Anderson, Australian author and playwright (b. 1916)
2011 – Don Ackerman, American basketball player (b. 1930)
  2011   – Facundo Cabral, Argentinian singer-songwriter (b. 1937)
2012 – Shin Jae-chul, South Korean-American martial artist (b. 1936)
  2012   – Chick King, American baseball player (b. 1930)
  2012   – Terepai Maoate, Cook Islander physician and politician, 6th Prime Minister of the Cook Islands (b. 1934)
  2012   – Eugênio Sales, Brazilian cardinal (b. 1920)
2013 – Markus Büchel, Liechtensteiner politician, 9th Prime Minister of Liechtenstein (b. 1959)
  2013   – Andrew Nori, Solomon lawyer and politician (b. 1952)
  2013   – Kiril of Varna, Bulgarian metropolitan (b. 1954)
  2013   – Barbara Robinson, American author and poet (b. 1927)
  2013   – Toshi Seeger, American activist, co-founded the Clearwater Festival (b. 1922)
2014 – Lorenzo Álvarez Florentín, Paraguayan violinist and composer (b. 1926)
  2014   – David Azrieli, Polish-Canadian businessman and philanthropist (b. 1922)
  2014   – Eileen Ford, American businesswoman, co-founded Ford Models (b. 1922)
  2014   – John Spinks, English guitarist and songwriter (b. 1953)
2015 – Christian Audigier, French fashion designer (b. 1958)
  2015   – Saud bin Faisal bin Abdulaziz Al Saud, Saudi Arabian economist and politician, Saudi Arabian Minister of Foreign Affairs (b. 1940)
2019 – William E. Dannemeyer, American politician (b. 1929)
  2019   – Ross Perot, American businessman and politician (b. 1930)
  2019   – Fernando de la Rúa, 43rd President of Argentina (b. 1937)
  2019   – Rip Torn, American actor (b. 1931)
  2019   – Freddie Jones, English actor (b. 1927)

Holidays and observances
Arbor Day (Cambodia)
Christian Feast Day:
Agilulfus of Cologne
Amandina of Schakkebroek (one of Martyrs of Southern Hunan)
Blessed Marija Petković
Everilda
Gregorio Grassi (one of Martyrs of Shanxi)
Martyr Saints of China
Martyrs of Gorkum
Our Lady of Itatí
Our Lady of Peace, Octave of the Visitation
Our Lady of the Rosary of Chiquinquirá
Pauline of the Agonizing Heart of Jesus
Stephen Langton, Archbishop of Canterbury (Anglican commemoration)
Veronica Giuliani
July 9 (Eastern Orthodox liturgics)
Constitution Day (Australia)
Constitution Day (Palau)
Constitutionalist Revolution Day (São Paulo)
Day of the Employees of the Diplomatic Service (Azerbaijan)
Independence Day, celebrates the declaration of independence of the United Provinces of South America by the Congress of Tucumán in 1816. (Argentina)
Independence Day, celebrates the independence of South Sudan from Sudan in 2011.
Nunavut Day (Nunavut)

Places
 July 9 Avenue

References

Bibliography

External links

 
 
 

Days of the year
July